Eberechi Patience Opara (born 6 March 1976) is a former female Nigerian  football defender.

She was part of the Nigeria women's national football team at the 1999 FIFA Women's World Cup, and at the 2000 Summer Olympics.

See also
 Nigeria at the 2000 Summer Olympics

References

External links
 
 
 

1976 births
Living people
Nigerian women's footballers
Place of birth missing (living people)
Footballers at the 2000 Summer Olympics
Olympic footballers of Nigeria
Women's association football defenders
Nigeria women's international footballers
1999 FIFA Women's World Cup players